KSLQ-FM (104.5 FM) is a radio station broadcasting a hot adult contemporary format. Licensed to Washington, Missouri, United States, the station serves Warren, Franklin, and St. Charles Counties in Missouri, as well as parts of western St. Louis County.  The station is currently owned by Y2k, Inc.  Brad Hildebrand, the current General Manager, originally worked at KSLQ-FM from 1973 through 1982, and then at KYKY from 1982 through 1990.  Brad's brother Lance still works at KYKY, which was known as the original KSLQ from September 1, 1972 until October 1, 1982.

Programming
The station plays hot adult contemporary music, mainly from the 1980s to the present.

References

External links

Radio-Locator Information on KSLQ-FM

SLQ-FM